Zsolt Muzsnay (born 20 June 1965) is a Romanian former footballer who played as a midfielder. His clubs included Universitatea Cluj, Bihor Oradea, Steaua București, Videoton Fehérvár and Royal Antwerp.

Muzsnay made six appearances for the Romania national team, and was named to the squad for the 1990 FIFA World Cup, before retiring in 1999.

He was also the head coach of Bihor Oradea in 2004.

Following his playing career, Muzsnay became the assistant coach of CFR Cluj.

Honours
Universitatea Cluj
Divizia B: 1984–85
Royal Antwerp
Belgian Cup: 1991–92

References

1965 births
Living people
Sportspeople from Cluj-Napoca
Romanian sportspeople of Hungarian descent
Romanian footballers
Romania international footballers
Association football midfielders
1990 FIFA World Cup players
Liga I players
Liga II players
Belgian Pro League players
Nemzeti Bajnokság I players
FC Universitatea Cluj players
FC Bihor Oradea players
FC Steaua București players
Fehérvár FC players
Royal Antwerp F.C. players
Romanian expatriate footballers
Romanian expatriate sportspeople in Hungary
Expatriate footballers in Hungary
Romanian expatriate sportspeople in Belgium
Expatriate footballers in Belgium
Romanian football managers
FC Bihor Oradea managers
CS Luceafărul Oradea managers